This article is about the transport in Zambia.

Railway

There is a total of 2,157 km (2008) of railway track in Zambia.

Principal lines

 Zambia Railways Limited (ZRL) –  narrow gauge, 846 km Kitwe-Ndola-New Kapiri Mposhi-Kabwe-Lusaka-Livingstone-Zimbabwe with several freight branches mostly in the Copperbelt totalling 427 km including to DR Congo. Passenger services between Kitwe and Livingstone only.
 TAZARA Railway –  narrow gauge, 891 km in Zambia: New Kapiri Mposhi-Mpika-Kasama-Dar es Salaam

Notable Branch lines

 Maamba Colliery Railway, Choma to Masuka, built to carry coal.
 The Mulobezi Railway (also known as Zambezi Sawmills Railway) is a narrow gauge line constructed to carry timber from Mulobezi to Livingstone. Has been reported at various times as defunct, currently listed in Railtracker (see 'Railway Network Map' below) but operating status not confirmed. 
 Mulungushi Commuter Line, later Njanji Commuter Line managed by ZRL, operated from 1991 to 1998 in Lusaka from the Chilenje-Libala to George townships (16 km); bids invited by the privatisiation board in September 2005 for re-opening it.

Railway links with adjacent countries 

  DR Congo – yes, Ndola to Sakania then Lubumbashi – , freight only. (For extensions and reconstruction beyond Lubumbashi see the DR Congo article).  The current operating status of Chililabombwe-DR Congo link not known.
  Tanzania – yes, from Kapiri Mposhi, border crossing at Nakonde, Zambia, to Dar es Salaam, TAZARA railway, passenger and freight –  
  Malawi – Chipata-Mchinji new link opened to traffic in 2010.
  Mozambique – no direct link, but indirectly to Beira and Maputo via Zimbabwe (no continuous passenger services).
  Zimbabwe – yes, from Livingstone via the Victoria Falls Bridge to Bulawayo, freight only.
  Botswana – no direct link, indirectly via Zimbabwe (no continuous passenger services).
  Namibia – no direct link.
  Angola – no direct link – but indirectly via DR Congo to Benguela on the Benguela Railway – same gauge , while the railway was inoperable for many years because of the Angolan Civil War, it has been recently reconstructed.

Proposed extensions

2007 
on 25 August 2007.
 A branch line from Nseluka on the TAZARA Railway to Mpulungu on Lake Tanganyika has been proposed.
A connection from the Chipata Railway when completed to the TAZARA line at Mpika has been mooted. This could be controversial as it would pass through or between the world-famous Luangwa Valley national parks. A more southerly route, linking Eastern Province towns such as Katete and Petauke and going to the TAZARA line at Serenje would by-pass the parks.

2006 

Zambia's North-West Extension – 8 February 2006 – Preparatory work is going forward on Zambia's proposed new north-western extension railway from Chingola to Solwezi, estimated to cost about $US235m.  The area has excellent mining potential which cannot be exploited effectively without rail facilities.  The route has been surveyed and the implications of compensating land owners are being worked out.

Australian and American interests are examining the project and the Development Bank of Southern Africa (DBSA) may help with finance.  The United States Trade and Development Agency (USTDA), another prospective source of funding, is also looking at the scheme.  Hopes have been expressed that the new line might eventually be extended to Mwinilunga and even to join Angola's Benguela Railway without relying on the DR Congo link, to restore what was until the 1970s Zambia's main route for exporting copper and other metals. In April 2012, according to newspaper reports, the Zambian government "has issued a permit to North-West Railway Company (NWR) for construction of the 554 km railway line from Chingola to Jimbe on the Angolan border".

The Angolan transport ministry plans to build a line branching off the Benguela Railway at Luacano and entering Zambia from Macango, thus avoiding DR Congo territory. The establishment of this direct link was also subject of talks during the visit of an Angolan delegation to Lusaka in May 2012. "The Benguela Railway will improve relations between the two countries as well as transportation of goods. It is encouraging that the railway on the Angolan side will reach the border by next year," said Keith Mukata, Zambian Deputy Minister for Commerce, Trade, and Industry.

Stations

Principal towns served by rail

Existing

Roads in Zambia 

Total:   91,440 km (2001)Paved:   20,117 km (2001) of which 6,779 km are trunk or main routes.Unpaved: 71,323 km (2001) (some of the unpaved highways are graded laterite roads)

In the 1970s Zambia had one of the best highway networks in sub-Saharan Africa. In 1991 it was estimated by the National Road Fund Agency (NRFA) that 80 percent of the road network had deteriorated and out of total road assets valued at US$2.3 billion, US$400 million had been lost due to neglected maintenance. The government introduced a road fund levy on fuel and that together with international aid has improved the highway network. In 2004 the NRFA rated 57% of paved roads in good condition, 22% in fair condition and 21% in poor condition.

Trunk Roads

Main Roads

List of principal highways and river crossings

Roads are listed by common name, if any, or main towns served. Major bridges or ferries given in italics. All the listed roads are paved except the Congo Pedicle in DR Congo territory. Note that some share sections, e.g. Great North Road & Tanzam highway between Kapiri Mposhi and Mpika. Usage levels are taken from the NRFA map linked above.

Central
 Lusaka-Copperbelt Road (The most-used inter-provincial highway) 
 Ndola-Kitwe Road (T3 Road) (4-lane divided highway – the most used inter-city highway)

North
 Great North Road (T2 Road) – Chirundu-Kafue-Lusaka-Kapiri Mposhi-Mpika-Isoka-TANZANIA / Chirundu Bridge (Zambezi), Kafue Bridge (Medium usage level)
 Tanzam Highway (northern section of Great North Road) – Kapiri Mposhi-Mpika-TANZANIA (Medium usage level)
 Old Great North Road – Mpika-Kasama-Mbala-Mpulungu / Chambeshi Bridge (Low usage level)
 Mansa-Samfya-Serenje Road / Luapula Bridge (Low usage level)
 Mansa-Nchelenge Road – ('Zambia Way' or Luapula Valley Road) (Low usage level)
 Congo Pedicle road – Mufulira-Mokambo-Chembe (links to Mansa) / Chembe Ferry – replacement bridge under construction – (Low usage level)
 Chingola-Lubumbashi/DR CONGO Road (Medium usage level and listed in very poor condition, Dec 2003)

East
 Great East Road – Lusaka-Chipata-MALAWI-MOZAMBIQUE / Luangwa Bridge (Low usage level)

West
 Lusaka-Mongu Road (Lusaka-Mongu) / Kafue Hook Bridge (Low usage level) (extends to Kalabo and Angola via the Barotse Floodplain causeway)
 Copperbelt-Solwezi-Mwinilunga-ANGOLA Road (T5 Road) (Low usage level)

South
 Southern section of Great North Road, see above, linking to Zimbabwe.
 Lusaka-Livingstone road – Kafue Bridge-Mazabuka-Choma-Livingstone-ZIMBABWE Road / Kafue Bridge, Victoria Falls Bridge (Zambezi) (Medium usage level)
 Livingstone-Sesheke Road (M10 Road) – Livingstone-Mambova (-BOTSWANA)-Sesheke-NAMIBIA Road / Kazungula Ferry (Zambezi, planned to be replaced by a bridge) to Botswana, Katima Mulilo Bridge (Zambezi) to Namibia. Linked to the Trans–Caprivi Highway by the Katima Mulilo Bridge. (Low usage level.)

Trade corridors 
As a landlocked minerals producer, Trade Corridors are vital to Zambia. In Zambia's case these are road and/or rail routes which cross international borders to ports and which are the subject of international agreements on planning, use and management. They are not separate from the road and rail networks listed above, but are entities superimposed on those networks for strategic economic and trade development. They are:
 Southern Corridor: to Durban Port via Johannesburg, South Africa via Zimbabwe (road or rail) or Botswana (road).
 Maputo Corridor: As for (1) but rail or road from Johannesburg to Maputo Port, Mozambique.
 Walvis Bay Corridor: Road via Livingstone/Sesheke/Katima Mulilo to Walvis Bay Port, Namibia.
 Beira Corridor: Road to Harare or rail to Bulawayo, then rail via Mutare to Beira, Mozambique.
 Nacala Corridor: road to Lilongwe then rail to Nacala, Mozambique.
 Tazara Corridor: road or rail via Kapiri Mposhi to Dar es Salaam, Tanzania.
 Lobito Corridor: rail via DR Congo to Lobito Bay, Angola (not currently operational, depends on Benguala Railway re-opening).
Corridors 1 to 6 may also be used by southeastern DR Congo though Zambia.

Water transport 

Although none of the major urban centres are located on usable waterways, Zambia is a relatively well-watered country but is mainly flat, meaning there are many navigable rivers, lakes and channels through swamps, which together reach a large proportion of the rural population. These offer a minimum-maintenance rural transport alternative. In the cases of Bangweulu and Mweru Wantipa in particular, there are permanent and seasonal fishing communities for whom the only access is by boat or canoe.

Main systems

 2,250 km of principal navigable rivers, including the upper Zambezi (Barotse Floodplain), Chambeshi, Kafue, Luapula; and the Luangwa, though not always in the dry season.
 other rivers navigable to canoes and small boats seasonally or in sections include the Dongwe/Kabompo and Lungwebungu in the west and Luena-Luongo and upper Kalungwishi in the north, and numerous others. 
 Lake transport – principal navigable lakes (with main port or boating centre in brackets): Lake Tanganyika (Mpulungu), Lake Mweru (Nchelenge-Kashikishi), Lake Mweru Wantipa (Kaputa), Lake Bangweulu (Samfya), Lake Kariba (Siavonga).
 Navigable channels in swamps: the largest of these is the Bangweulu Swamps comprising hundreds of kilometres of channels over an area of up to 10,000 km2 depending on season. Others include the upper Zambezi/Barotse Floodplain especially at Mongu, the lower Luapula, the Mweru Marshes, Lukanga Swamp, and the Luena-Lufubu swamps at Mushota, Kawambwa district.

Air transport 
Zambia has an 'open skies' policy since the state-owned national carrier failed. Before its demise, Zambian Airways was the only Zambia-based scheduled carrier. As of 2022, there are several scheduled carriers based in Zambia: Zambia Airways, Proflight Zambia, Royal Zambian Airlines, and Mahogany Air.

Only six of Zambia's airports see scheduled commercial flights: Chipata Airport, Harry Mwanga Nkumbula International Airport, Kenneth Kaunda International Airport, Mfuwe Airport, Simon Mwansa Kapwepwe International Airport, and Solwezi Airport. Zambia's three international airports offer passenger flights to Dar es Salaam, Johannesburg, Mbombela, Dubai, Harare, Addis Ababa, Nairobi, Lilongwe, Doha, Kigali, Gaborone, and Cape Town.

Airports – With Paved Runways
Total: 8Over 3,047 m: 12,438 to 3,047 m: 31,524 to 2,437 m: 3914 to 1,523 m: 1 (2012)

Airfields – with unpaved runways
Total: 802,438 to 3,047 m: 11,524 to 2,437 m: 5914 to 1,523 m: 53under 914 m: 21 (2012)

See also 
 Zambia
 Zambia railways
 TAZARA Railway

References

External links

 National Road Fund Agency website
 UN Map
 Railway Map
 Railtracker (ACIS/UNCTAD) Zambia Railway Network Diagram